Henry Begg Hall (born 22 April 1945) is a  Scottish former football player and manager.

The peak of Hall's career as a player was when he was with for St Johnstone during the early 1970s, while Willie Ormond was manager; during this time they came third in the Scottish Football League and reached a Scottish League Cup Final. Hall made his name at Stirling Albion, and later served Dundee United and Forfar Athletic. He also managed Forfar and Montrose.

He taught physical education (PE) at Larbert High School and Falkirk High School in the early 1970s, Kirkton High School in the late 1970s and at Rockwell High School (Dundee) in the 1980s. Hall worked as a youth team coach for St Johnstone between 2000 and 2002. He was made redundant in 2002 as the club cut costs after they were relegated from the Scottish Premier League.

References

1945 births
Living people
Scottish footballers
Scottish football managers
Footballers from Falkirk (council area)
Kirkintilloch Rob Roy F.C. players
Scottish Junior Football Association players
St Johnstone F.C. players
Dundee United F.C. players
Stirling Albion F.C. players
Forfar Athletic F.C. players
Forfar Athletic F.C. managers
Montrose F.C. managers
Association football forwards
Scottish Football League players
St Johnstone F.C. non-playing staff
Scottish Football League representative players
Scottish Football League managers
Association football coaches